Bhaktha Hanuman, dubbed into Telugu as Anjaneya Charithra is a 1980 Indian Malayalam film,  directed by Ganga and produced by S. Kumar. It is based on the life of the Hindu  god Sri Hanuman. The film stars popular Telugu actor Arja Janardhana Rao in the lead role. The film's musical score was written by V. Dakshinamoorthy.

Story line
The film tells the story of the Lord Hanuman, who is worshipped by Hindus throughout the world, and has an important place of his own as a devotee of Lord Rama. It is told by Hanuman himself when he meets the Pandava Bhima, his younger half-brother.

Cast

 Janardhana Rao as Hanuman
 Ravikumar as Rama
 Shobhana (Roja Ramani) as Sita
 Hari as Lakshman
Balan K. Nair as Ravana
Ushakumari as Mandodari
Jose Prakash as Vibhishana
Lalu Alex as Meghanadhan a.k.a. Indrajit
Sreelatha Namboothiri as Thara
Sukumari as Anjana (Hanuman's mother)
Jyothi Lakshmi as Dancer at Indra's court
Jayamalini as Dancer at Ravana's court
Halam as Dancer at Indra's court
Leela

Soundtrack
The music was composed by V. Dakshinamoorthy and the lyrics were written by Sreekumaran Thampi.

References

External links
 

1980 films
1980s Malayalam-language films